Benny Tetamashimba was a Zambian Movement for Multiparty Democracy (MMD) politician and had been a Member of Parliament for Solwezi Central from  2001 to 2009 when he died. Tetamashimba was a member of United Party for National Development prior to joining the MMD.

Parliamentary participation

Benny Tetamashimba has been known to be active member of parliament both as a minister and as an MP.  Tetamashimba has given a number of reports to the Zambian parliament.

Hospital and death

Tetamashimba was evacuated to South Africa for specialist treatment on August 9, 2009. On September 3, 2009, it was reported that Tetamashimba had been brought back to University Teaching Hospital of Zambia in critical condition and was unable to speak. On September 5, it was reported that Tetamashimba had died at 18:30hrs, GMT.

References

 

2009 deaths
Members of the National Assembly of Zambia
United Party for National Development politicians
Movement for Multi-Party Democracy politicians
1955 births
People from North-Western Province, Zambia